De Toverspiegel  is a 1951 Dutch film directed by Willy van Hemert.

Cast
Albert van Dalsum	... 	Professor Video
Louis Bouwmeester	... 	Leerling
Hetty Blok		
Johan De Meester		
Ad Hooykaas		
Ank van der Moer

External links 
 

1951 films
Dutch black-and-white films
Dutch drama films
1951 drama films